The North American Chapter of the Association for Computational Linguistics (NAACL) provides a regional focus for members of the Association for Computational Linguistics (ACL) in North America as well as in Central and South America, organizes annual conferences, promotes cooperation and information exchange among related scientific and professional societies, encourages and facilitates ACL membership by people and institutions in the Americas, and provides a source of information on regional activities for the ACL Executive Committee.

NAACL was formed in 1998 for the purposes of encouraging and facilitating membership in the Association by persons and institutions in North America, providing a regional focus for members of the Association in North America and a source of information on North American activities for the Association Executive Committee, disseminating of Association and Chapter publications and information materials, and promoting cooperation and information exchange among related scientific and professional societies within North America.

The NAACL hosts an annual professional conference in a North American city during alternating years in which the ACL holds its annual conference elsewhere. The conference has about a 22% acceptance rate of papers, and highlights its Best Paper awards each year.

NAACL 2021

NAACL-HLT 2021 aims to bring together researchers interested in the design and study of natural language processing technology as well as its applications to new problem areas. With this goal in mind, NAACL-HLT 2021 invites the submission of long and short papers on creative, substantial and unpublished research in all aspects of computational linguistics. More details will be available on the conference website.

NAACL 2021 officers include Colin Cherry (chair), Heng Ji (secretary), Jonathan May (treasurer), and Julia Hockenmaier (past chair).

NAACL 2022

The Annual Meeting of the North American Chapter of the Association for Computational Linguistics (NAACL) took place July 10-15, 2022 as a hybrid event, in Seattle, WA, and online.

References

External links
 NAACL home page
 ACL home page
 ACL Anthology
 ACL Wiki
 EACL home page

Computational linguistics
Professional associations based in the United States
Association for Computational Linguistics

eu:Association for Computational Linguistics
pt:Association for Computational Linguistics